The Draconian constitution, or Draco's code, was a written law code enforced by Draco in Athens near the end of the 7th century BC; its composition started around 621 BC. It was written in response to the unjust interpretation and modification of oral law by Athenian aristocrats. As most societies in Ancient Greece codified basic law during the mid-seventh century BC, Athenian oral law was manipulated by the aristocracy until the emergence of Draco's code. Around 621 BC the people of Athens commissioned Draco to devise a written law code and constitution, giving him the title of the first legislator of Athens. The literate could read the code at a central location accessible to anyone. This enactment of a rule of law was an early manifestation of Athenian democracy.

Background

The need for written laws began with the unequal access to legal knowledge of the aristocracy as compared with the general populace; the established laws of Athens were inefficiently formulated in the spoken language and often modified and re-evaluated. The aristocratic exploitation of this system began during the mid-seventh century BC, and laws were often amended to benefit the aristocracy. This triggered feuds by families ignorant of the law in an attempt to obtain justice.

To minimize the incidence of these feuds, the governing aristocratic families of Athens decided to abandon their concealed system of legal proposals and amendments and promulgate them to Athenian society in writing. They authorized Draco, an aristocratic legislator, to construct the written constitution, and he began to write the text around 621 BC. To promulgate the new constitution, its text was inscribed on displaying devices. As a result, the Draconian constitution was accessible to the literate.

Draco introduced the concepts of intentional and unintentional homicide, with both crimes adjudicated at the Areopagus. Since murder cases were tried by the state, feuds as a form of justice became illegal. The homicide laws were the only laws retained by the early-6th-century BC Solonian Constitution.

Although the full Draconian constitution no longer exists, severe punishments were reportedly meted out to those convicted of offenses as minor as stealing an apple. There may have been only one penalty, execution, for all convicted violators of the Draconian constitution and the laws were said to be written in blood instead of ink. These legends have become part of the English language, with the adjective "draconian" referring to unusually harsh punishment.

Suffrage
Hoplites were entitled to participate in political life; they could vote and hold minor state official positions. To hold higher positions, property was required. Hoplites with debt-free property valued at ten minas or more could serve as an eponymous archon or a Treasurer. The Athenian strategoi (generals) and hipparchoi (cavalry commanders) were chosen from those holding unencumbered property worth at least 100 minas with offspring over 10 years of age who were born in wedlock. Four hundred and one Council members were chosen by lot from hoplites at least 30 years of age. No one could be elected by lot more than once to serve on the council until the Council "cast the lot afresh": again included every eligible individual for the next Council when everyone had served a turn.
Election to political positions in Athens was based on sortition except for the Areopagus, which consisted of retired archons.

Council and assembly
The council was another concept Draco introduced to Athenian government in his constitution. In Aristotle's Constitution of the Athenians, the council was vaguely characterized as a magistracy. The Assembly was another Athenian magistracy which was described in detail by Aristotle.

Council or Assembly members who were absent from a meeting were fined, with the fines proportionate to social class. If the absent member was from the pentacosiomedimnus class, they were fined three drachmas. Knights were fined two drachmas, and zeugites one drachma.

In Constitution of the Athenians

Setting
Aristotle's timeline of the Draconian constitution is characterized by the vague phrase "not very long after":

Given the founding of Athens by Cecrops I and its first constitution in 1556 BC, its legal framework would have functioned for over 900 years before Draco codified the laws and drafted his constitution around 620 BC. Therefore, subsequently, commentators assume that the phrase "not very long after" refers instead to the more-recent Cylonian affair.

Prytanes
Aristotle's undefined use of "Prytanes" refers to a number of Athenian state positions during and after the development of the Draconian constitution:

"Prytanes" later referred to the fifty members of the council, although their only other appearance in the context of the Draconian constitution was in Herodotus' account of the Cylonian affair (where the "Prytanes of Naucrari" are mentioned). This may have occurred due to Herodotus' (a Dorian) habit of referring to the first magistrates of Dorian cities as "Prytanes of Naucrari" and conflating them with the first magistrates of Athens (the Archons). Thucydides' more-detailed version also refers to Herodotus' "Prytanes of Naucrari." He wrote: "Those to whom the people had confided the keeping of the citadel, seeing the partisans of Cylon perish at the feet of the statue of Minerva, caused them to go out of the citadel, promising them that no harm would be done to them." As Thucydides had mentioned in his account of the Cylonian affair, the nine Archons were the people entrusted with the citadel.

Relationships among Athenian officials
A relationship between current officials and the Prytanes, strategoi and hipparchoi of the preceding year concerning financial securities is a controversial text in the Oxford Classical Text edition of Aristotle's Constitution of the Athenians, translated by Frederic G. Kenyon:

Draco's position

Until the discovery of Aristotle's Constitution of the Athenians, Draco was not considered a political reformer. Although the Draconian constitution is not mentioned by contemporary historians, his position as a political and constitutional reformer and a lawgiver was emphasized by Aristotle (despite the repeal of most of his laws, except those governing homicide).

References

Civil codes
Ancient Greek law
Ancient Greek constitutions
7th century BC in Greece
